Libyan tea is a strong beverage, prepared with traditional set of stainless utensils and served in a small glass cups. It is similar to Moroccan tea in prepared by boiling loose tea leaves but differ in presentation. Libyan tea is usually served in three courses with the last round including boiled skinless peanuts or almonds. Mint or basil are sometimes added as a flavor. Initially sugarless beverage is prepared to allow for a foam formation. Each cup when finally presented would have a layer of yellowish foam on top of the tea.

See also
Libyan cuisine
Arabic tea
Maghrebi mint tea
Tea culture

References

Arab cuisine
Libyan cuisine